Jamal Mohamed Al-Fakhro is a Bahraini legislator, business advisor and a member of Shura Council, the Bahraini upper house of parliament. He is a Managing Partner of one of the recognized BIG Four Companies - KPMG in Bahrain.

Career 
Fakhro was the first Arabian to be appointed as a member of the KPMG Global Board and Global council. Fakhro was the Chairman of the KPMG Middle East and South Asia (MESA) Board; and member of the KPMG Europe, Middle East and Africa (EMA) Regional Board till Oct 2014. Having served as Managing Partner since 1987, he has extensive experience in the field of Audit, Tax and Advisory services in the region, especially for the government, banking and financial services sectors. He also advises family businesses in relation to family governance, risk and sustainable succession planning.
Fakhro has a special interest in the matters of Corporate Governance, and is a Founding Board Member of the Pearl Initiative in the Middle East, an initiative developed with the collaboration with the UN office for partnership aiming for transparency and accountability in the private sector.

Early life and education 
After his graduation from Cairo University with a degree in accounting in 1977, Fakhro joined Fakhro Establishment for Accounting and Auditing. The firm then was focusing on national work and clients and had not more than 15 employees. Fakhro, along with the partners of the firm (Jassim Fakhro and Hussain Kasim), worked together to join a global firm, eventually becoming a national representative firm of KMG in 1982. In 1988 he led the negotiation of merging the operations of Fakhro Establishment and Peat Marwick to establish KPMG Fakhro in Bahrain.

Public interest 

Fakhro has been a member of the Shura Council since 1992 and the 'First Vice Chairman' for a number of legislative terms. A member of the Shura Council for over two decades, he has held responsibility multiple roles in different fields. For many years he was the Chairman of the Committee on Financial and Economic Affairs. Fakhro was also a member of the Committee preparing the National Action Charter of Bahrain (2001), subsequently he was a member of the committee activating the National Action Charter (2002), the National Dialogue (2011), and the National Committee to follow up on the implementation of the Bahrain Independent Commission of Inquiry (BICI) Report (2011–2012).

In his role as Shura Council member, Fakhro has headed up a number of international, regional & national delegations at parliamentarian conferences. He has also been heading the Bahrain delegation to the IPU (Inter-Parliamentary Union) since 2007.

Recognitions 

Fakhro was recognized and honoured with the Shaikh Isa bin Salman Al Khalifa Medal of a second-class, by His Majesty King Hamad bin Isa Al Khalifa, at the opening ceremony of the eighth session of former Shura Council.

References

External links 

1956 births
Living people
Members of the Consultative Council (Bahrain)